Les Brown may refer to:

 Les Brown (bandleader) (1912–2001), American big band leader
 Les Brown (speaker) (born 1945), American author, motivational speaker, and former Ohio politician
 The Les Brown Show, a 1993 talk show hosted by him
 Les Brown (American football) (born 1987), NFL tight end

See also
 Leslie Brown (disambiguation)
 Leslie Browne (born 1957), American ballet dancer and actress
 Les Battersby-Brown, fictional character in British soap-opera Coronation Street